Henry Zakka (born July 29, 1956, Caracas, Venezuela) is a Venezuelan actor and director who began acting in the 1980s and 1990s in RCTV telenovelas.

Filmography

As director

Television

Films 

 The Christ Child (2021)
 Uma (2018)
 Aurora (2016) Shortfilm
 Devuelveme la vida (2016)

References

External links

1956 births
Venezuelan male telenovela actors
Living people
Venezuelan people of Japanese descent
Male actors from Caracas
Male actors of Japanese descent
Venezuelan male television actors
20th-century Venezuelan male actors